Irish Birding News was a quarterly journal published by the team behind the Birds of Ireland News Service  (B.I.N.S.), and was somewhat along the lines of an Irish form of Birding World. It included a summary of rarities reported to the birdline, articles relating to identification, usually of birds spotted in Ireland, and site guides for birding spots in Ireland and abroad.

References 

Journals and magazines relating to birding and ornithology